Dicromantispa moronei is an extinct species of mantidfly in the neuropteran family Mantispidae known from a fossil found in the Caribbean.

History and classification
Dicromantispa moronei was described from a solitary female holotype fossil which is preserved as an inclusion in a transparent chunk of Dominican amber.  When first published, the amber resided in a private amber collection owned by Ettore Morone of Turin, Italy.  The amber dates from at least the Burdigalian stage of the Miocene, based on studying the associated fossil Foraminifera and may be as old as the Middle Eocene, based on the associated fossil coccoliths. This age range is due to the host rock being secondary deposits for the amber and the Miocene the age range is only the youngest that it might be.

The female was first studied by entomologists Michael Engel of the university of Kansas and David Grimaldi of the American Museum of Natural History with their 2007 type description of the species was published in the natural sciences journal American Museum Novitates.  The specific epithet moronei is a patronym honoring Ettore Morone.  D. moronei is one of two fossil Dicromantispa species Engel and Grimaldi described in 2007.  The other species, D. electromexicana, is from the similarly aged Mexican amber of Chiapas, Mexico.

Description
The holotype female of D. moronei is complete. Between D. electromexicana and D. moronei the shorter, wider, pronotum of D. moronei along with the smaller size and longer profemoral spine of D. electromexicana separate the two species. The head is lacking an occiptal margin and the antennae are a light brown in coloration. The antennae are composed of 29 flagellomeres, with ones closer to the base longer than wide and ones closer to the tip wider than long.

References

Mantispoidea
Burdigalian life
Neogene Dominican Republic
Miocene insects of North America
Prehistoric insects of the Caribbean
Fauna of Hispaniola
Insects of the Dominican Republic
Fossils of the Dominican Republic
Dominican amber
Fossil taxa described in 2007